Big Cypress may refer to: 

Big Cypress Preserve, Bienville Parish, Louisiana
Big Cypress Bayou in northeast Texas
Big Cypress Creek in northeast Texas
Big Cypress National Preserve, Florida
Big Cypress Indian Reservation, Florida
Big Cypress (Phish festival), a weekend-long festival hosted by the band Phish on New Year's Eve 1999
Big Cypress, Florida, planned community in Collier County